Shahrak-e Danesh may refer to:

Shahrak-e Danesh, Qazvin
Shahrak-e Danesh, Tehran